The Lieyu Township Culture Museum is a museum in Lieyu Township, Kinmen County, Taiwan.

History
The museum established in 2006 in the former building of Lieyu Township Office.

Architecture
The museum spans over an area of more than 1,000 m2 in 2 floors. The ground floor consists of exhibition gallery, activity center and video room, while the upper floor consists of regular and special exhibits.

Exhibitions
The museum exhibits the local daily culture artifacts, including military items. It displays 500 pieces of historical relics, 100 pieces of old documents and 300 pieces of old photos and military documents.

References

2006 establishments in Taiwan
Lieyu Township
Museums established in 2006
Museums in Kinmen County